Gaetano Orsolini (7 March 1884 – July 1954) was an Italian sculptor, medallist and engraver.

Orsolini was born in Montegiorgio.  He was most notable for his work on Italian memorials to the First World War and as the designer of Italy's variant of the Allied Victory Medal.  He died in Turin.

Sources
 https://web.archive.org/web/20060509030838/http://www.comune.montegiorgio.ap.it/arte%26storia/Personaggi/Orsolini/orsolini.htm
 https://web.archive.org/web/20070929080940/http://www.comune.montegiorgio.ap.it/arte%26storia/orsolini/index.htm

1884 births
1954 deaths
Italian engravers
Italian medallists
20th-century Italian sculptors
20th-century Italian male artists
Italian male sculptors
20th-century engravers